Lutino is a bird that exhibits a yellow pigmentation known as xanthochromism. It may refer to:
 Lutino budgies
 Lutino cockatiel mutation
 Lutino rosy-faced lovebird mutation